The M8 Armored Gun System (AGS), sometimes known as the Buford, is an American light tank that was intended to replace the M551 Sheridan and TOW missile–armed Humvees in the 82nd Airborne Division and 2nd Armored Cavalry Regiment (2nd ACR) of the U.S. Army respectively.

The M8 AGS began as a private venture of FMC Corporation, called the Close Combat Vehicle Light (CCVL), in 1983. The Army began the Armored Gun System program to develop a mobile gun platform that could be airdropped. By 1992, the AGS was one of the Army's top priority acquisition programs. The service selected FMC's CCVL over proposals from three other teams. The service sought to purchase 237 AGS systems to begin fielding in 1997.

The Army canceled the M8 AGS program in 1996 over the objections of Congress and the Department of Defense, due to the service's budgetary constraints. The Sheridan was retired without a true successor. The AGS never saw service, though the 82nd Airborne sought to press the preproduction units into service in Iraq. The AGS was unsuccessfully marketed for export, and was reincarnated for several subsequent U.S. Army assault gun/light tank programs. United Defense LP proposed the AGS as the Mobile Gun System (MGS) variant of the Interim Armored Vehicle program in 2000, but lost out to the General Motors–General Dynamics' LAV III, which was type classified as the Stryker M1128 Mobile Gun System. BAE Systems offered the AGS system for the Army's Mobile Protected Firepower requirement, but lost to the General Dynamics Griffin in 2022.

Development

The U.S. Army recognized the poor performance of the M551 Sheridan light tank in the Vietnam War and began the process of retiring the vehicle in 1977. A small number were retained in active service by the 82nd Airborne Division and the National Guard. The Army designated the M3 Bradley armored reconnaissance vehicle to partially fill the Sheridan's role.

Initial efforts 

In the 1980s, the Army began looking for a more capable replacement for the Sheridan. During this time, a string of Army projects to update or replace the Sheridan were begun, but all ended without the Army committing to buy. Some of its efforts around this time could be described as hopelessly intermingled.

In 1979, Army Chief of Staff General Edward C. Meyer initiated a transformation of the 9th Infantry Division that would see the light infantry division assume many of the characteristics of the heavy division through an infusion of high or emerging technology. The so-called "High Technology Light Division" would require the procurement of a Mobile Protected Gun, later called the Assault Gun System (AGS), and a Fast Attack Vehicle. The notional Mobile Protected Gun was to be armed with a kinetic gun, or possibly a missile, capable of defeating enemy armor. In any case, the service determined that it needed a more immediate solution for the AGS requirement. In 1985, the Army approved a U.S. Army Training and Doctrine Command  (TRADOC) recommendation to field the TOW missile-armed Humvee in the interim. The TOW-armed Humvee proved to be an inadequate substitute for the AGS in the 9th Infantry Division as it could not fire on the move and was too lightly armored.

In 1980, the U.S. Army Infantry School's Mobile Protected Gun project analyzed anti-armor weapons systems, concluding that the Army should equip its new light infantry divisions with TOW-armed Humvees and an unspecified 6×6 lightly armored vehicle armed with a 25 mm caliber gun. This led the Secretary of Defense to direct the Army to use the LAV-25 for this purpose. In 1981, the Army joined the Marine Corps's Mobile Protected Gun System program. The MPGS was canceled the following year. The basic chassis of the Sheridan was considered to be in good working order even if its problematic 152 mm caliber gun/launcher was not. Both the Marine Corps and Army explored re-gunning the Sheridan with a conventional gun. In 1983, the Naval Surface Weapons Center mounted a 105 mm cannon to a Sheridan. One Army plan also envisioned re-gunning a few dozen Sheridan with 105 mm or 120 mm cannons, but this project was canceled in 1985. In the end the Army determined upgrading the Sheridan to meet the AGS requirement was not worth pursuing.

After the cancelation of the MPGS program, the project morphed into the Armored/Assault Gun System. In 1983, the Army established the AGS program. In 1985, Army Vice Chief of Staff General Maxwell Thurman approved an amended Requirement Operational Capability (ROC) for the Armored Gun System. Thurman recommended that the Army purchase 500 AGS systems. The Army Chief of Staff did not advocate for funding the program in Congress given its low priority. Senate appropriators declined the Army's request for AGS funds for FY1986. The program office was disestablished, and the ROC retracted. In May 1986, the AGS program was re-organized under the Armored Family of Vehicles Task Force (AFVTV). During one concept study for a proposed All Purpose Fire Support Platoon, the task force shortlisted four candidate vehicles for an Armored Support Platform. These were the FMC Corporation Close Combat Vehicle Light (CCVL), the Cadillac Gage Stingray, the General Motors LAV-105, and the Teledyne AGS. The task force recommended the latter.

In 1987, the Army tested a version of the LAV-25, designated as the M1047. The Army determined that these were unsuitable for LAPES, and with only a 25 mm caliber cannon, could not match the firepower of the Sheridan. Congress did not favor the M1047, though a few were deployed with the 3/73rd Armor of the 82nd Airborne Division in the Gulf War.

In August 1987, the Office of the Secretary of Defense approved the AGS program initiative for 600 vehicles. A joint Army–Marine Corps program was mooted. The ROC was approved for the second time in September. In December, the AGS program was dropped as the $800 million ($ in ) plan was considered unaffordable. Around the same time, the Army Chief of Staff issued a "promissory note" to replace the Sheridan by FY1995.

Rebooted program 
In September 1989, the Armored Gun System Project Manager office was reestablished at the United States Army Tank-automotive and Armaments Command and a marketing survey was distributed to industry. In March 1990, Army Chief of Staff Carl E. Vuono told the Senate Appropriations Defense Subcommittee that the Army was surveying options for acquiring about 70 tanks to replace the Sheridan. The Army formalized the AGS program in April 1990 with the validation of a new ROC.

In July 1990, the Senate Armed Services Committee (SASC) required that the Army procure the AGS off-the-shelf. In August, SASC directed the Army to halt work on Armored Systems Modernization until it could conduct a competition for an AGS. The AGS program had gained political favor by this point due in part to the back-to-back successful employment of the Sheridan in two overseas operations. In December 1989, Sheridans of the 3/73 Armor were airdropped into Panama as part of Operation Just Cause. This was the first successful employment of light armor in combat. In August 1990, Sheridans were airdropped into Saudi Arabia as the spearhead of the buildup of Operation Desert Shield. In October 1990, HASC  deferred the Block III main battle tank and directed the Army to make the AGS its top priority modernization program. After having earlier tried to kill the tank, appropriators grew to appreciate the program's relatively low price tag.

In November 1990, the Defense Acquisition Board authorized the Army to proceed with development of the AGS. The Army believed that replacing the Sheridan with an off-the-shelf AGS would be less expensive and provide more capabilities than an upgraded Sheridan. It was expected to replace the Sheridan in the 3/73rd Armor and TOW missile-armed Humvees in the 2nd Armored Cavalry Regiment (2nd ACR).

In November 1990, Congressional appropriators sought for the Army to utilize the LAV-105 for the AGS role or "show clear and convincing evidence that the LAV-105 is unable to fulfill the requirement". The Army agreed. In 1991, the Senate and House Armed Services Committees joined in directing the Army to integrate the turret and Watervliet Arsenal EX35 gun of the LAV-105 with an AGS chassis. A joint program was balked at by both services, who believed the two platforms were mismatched. Subsequently, the Marine Corps demurred and requested no further funding for the LAV-105. In any event, the proposed chimera was nixed by the Senate Appropriations Committee later that year.

The Army issued a draft request for proposals (RfP) in May 1991. The Army published the RfP in August incorporating changes as a result of feedback from industry and Congress, the latter of which had directed the Army to require the EX35 gun. Army Acquisition Executive Stephen K. Conver became concerned that the AGS program was becoming laden with unnecessary requirements that would increase costs and development time, as well as limit the number of interested contractors. In view of this, in October 1991, Conver's office conducted a review of the requirements. The Army updated its RfP later that year, with submissions due in December.

FMC Corporation submitted the Close Combat Vehicle Light to meet the AGS requirement.

Three other teams submitted proposals:

General Dynamics Land Systems and Teledyne Continental Motors submitted a version of the Teledyne tank included in the AFVTV study. This was an unconventional design with a low-profile turret and the crew located in the turret basket below the hull line.
Cadillac Gage Textron submitted the Commando Stingray with the LAV-105 turret.
Team Hägglunds USA submitted a variant of the Combat Vehicle 90 with a GIAT turret.

In June 1992, the Army selected the FMC proposal. FMC Ground Systems Division was awarded a $27.7 million ($ in ) contract to begin phase 1 work, including the production of six test units. The bids for this phase ranged from a high of $189 million ($ in ) for GDLS–Teledyne and a low of $92 million ($ in ) for Hägglunds. The procurement program was valued at $800 million.

The Close Combat Vehicle Light becomes the AGS 

FMC began developing the Close Combat Vehicle Light as a private venture in 1983. The vehicle was designed from the outset to meet the Army's as-yet unfunded Armored Gun System requirement. FMC built two mock-ups. The first was a front-engine model utilizing a  diesel engine. The second was a rear-engine model with a  diesel engine and featuring more armor. In 1984, FMC validated the feasibility of pairing the 105 mm gun with a light chassis by test firing a 105 mm gun mounted on an M548. The first prototype CCVL was completed in August 1985 and debuted at the meeting of the Association of the United States Army in October. The CCVL was demonstrated at Fort Bragg in 1987. 

The Army did not originally require that the AGS be air-droppable by the C-130, believing that the requirement would deter submissions. Nevertheless, FMC's proposal claimed that this desired capability was possible with its design. After winning the contract, FMC made several weight-saving changes to the design, particularly the pallets, in order to meet the C-130's weight limit.

In a December 1993 report, the Defense Department Inspector General cautioned that the AGS would be too heavy for low-velocity airdrop. The report said the AGS did not meet the Army's requirements for air mobility, and recommended delaying low-rate initial production until the airdrop requirement could be met. The Army strongly refuted the IG's report.

Citing cuts in the service's procurement budget, in 1993, the Army reduced its planned AGS order from 300 to 233. In 1994, the Army settled on an acquisition target of 237 vehicles.  Of these, 123 would go to the 2nd Armored Cavalry Regiment, 58 to the 82nd, and 56 to reserves and training bases. The last 169 AGS systems, to be produced from 1998 to 2002, were to be built without the weight-saving modifications of those destined for the 82nd, which was the only unit that required an airdroppable AGS system. The AGS's budget was zeroed and the production schedule slipped by one year in Congress's FY1995 budget due to program cost growth.

Six prototypes were built under the designation XM8. The first of these was rolled out at the United Defense (created by a merger of FMC and BMY) facility in San Jose, California, in April 1994, and arrived at Fort Knox, Kentucky, in April 1995. The last of these was delivered in May. United Defense provided five XM8 AGS systems to the service's Operational Test Command, which put the vehicle through five months of testing at Fort Pickett, Virginia. Another prototype underwent survivability testing at Aberdeen Proving Ground, Maryland.

Cancelation 

In 1995, the Army explored cutting the 2nd ACR, which would reduce the Army's buy to 80 AGS. These would be destined for the 82nd Airborne. In May 1995, the National Guard expressed interest in procuring the AGS for the 38th Infantry Division, 35th Infantry Division and 34th Infantry Division in order to help bridge the looming capability gap should the 2nd ACR be eliminated. This proposal was rejected by the service. Army Chief of Staff Gordon R. Sullivan, the AGS's most influential advocate at the Pentagon, retired in June 1995. In October 1995, the Army type classified the XM8 as the M8 Armored Gun System. It approved an initial production run of 26 vehicles, with an option for 42 more scheduled to begin in FY1997. A full production decision was scheduled for March 1997. Fielding to the 3/73 Armor would begin in 1999. All three squadrons of the 2nd ACR were to be fielded subsequently.

The end of the Cold War had precipitated a fall-off in U.S. military spending. The President's FY1996 budget request allotted the Department of Defense (DoD) the lowest procurement budget level since 1950. The AGS was one of several systems that did not fare well in an Army review of anti-armor weapons then under development. Responding to budget cuts anticipated in the period FY98–03, in 1996 the Army adopted a new policy: Instead of distributing small cuts throughout many projects, entire programs would be canceled. Army Chief of Staff Dennis Reimer canceled the AGS in January 1996.

Many officials felt blindsided by the Army's decision to kill the AGS. The Army's decision to cancel the AGS lacked a formal announcement, but was soon leaked to the press. This displeased some lawmakers including Senate Armed Services Committee chairman Strom Thurmond, who privately expressed irritation to Defense Secretary William J. Perry about having learned of the cancelation through media reports.

Ten Representatives signed a letter urging Perry to continue on with the program. The letter touted the program's "tremendous success" in meeting the program's objectives, and noted that the vehicle was "well within budget and on schedule." The House appropriations national security subcommittee requested that the DoD pause the cancelation of the AGS pending a Congressional review. The subcommittee said that the AGS had met its milestones and "would be a strong candidate for increased funding."

The Army belatedly sought to win Congressional and DoD support for its decision to cancel the tank. Securing the blessings of the Office of the Secretary of Defense would ensure that the service would not have to forfeit unspent FY1996 funds from the AGS program. The DoD, at least at first, affirmed its support for the program and called it "premature" for any service branch to draw any conclusions about the outyear funding environment. However, in February the Joint Requirements Oversight Council (JROC) endorsed the Army's decision. Despite JROC's recommendation, Perry withheld his support for canceling the AGS until he could personally meet with key congressmen. Perry's office said it would review the Army's plans for the $1 billion originally earmarked for the AGS before making a decision.

The Army issued a stop-work order to United Defense in February. In May 1996, the Army Vice Chief of Staff formally announced the cancelation of the AGS. The service estimated killing the program would save the Army $1 billion. The service sought to reallocate unspent FY1996 funds from the AGS program on military pay, construction and modernization programs.

In order to help offset the loss of capability caused by the cancelation of the AGS, the Army increased its requested funding for M1A2 Abrams and M2A3 Bradley upgrades, and accelerated the development of the Javelin missile. The Army considered a variety of plans to "heavy up" the 2nd ACR.  The service added heavy armor to the 2nd ACR and requested funding to purchase Apache helicopters. In the 82nd Airborne, the Army also planned to introduce the EFOGM missile and considered more widely fielding the Javelin missile. Funding for EFOGM was deleted in 1998. The Army also considered the Humvee-mounted MGM-166 LOSAT missile, another platform offering similar capabilities for the 82nd Airborne. However, this program was canceled in FY2005.

The 3/73rd Armor was inactivated over the following two years. The last Sheridans in service were vismod Sheridans used for opposing force training. These too were retired in 2004. Maintaining the Sheridan was not thought to be practical. In place of the Sheridan in the 82nd Airborne, the Army stood up an Immediate Ready Company of Bradley Fighting Vehicles and M1A1 Abrams tanks from the 3rd Infantry Division which were to be attached to the 82nd.

Milestones and schedule 

A Milestone I/II review was completed in May 1992. The Engineering and Manufacturing Development contract was awarded to FMC in June 1992 for a ballistic structure, six test vehicles, and technical data. A Critical Design Review was completed in September 1993. Six pre-production prototypes underwent technical testing in FY94–95. Early User Test and Experimentation was completed in June 1995 and was highlighted by a successful LVAD of a prototype AGS.

Live fire testing and Initial Operational Test and Evaluation was scheduled to be conducted in FY96. A full-rate production decision was 
scheduled for March 1997 (Milestone III).

Proposed revivals 
In 1998, the Senate Armed Services Committee proposed using the M8 AGS as a surrogate vehicle to evaluate "strike force experimentation activities" in the 2nd Cavalry Regiment.

In October 1999, Army Chief of Staff Eric Shinseki laid out his vision for a lighter, more transportable force. The Army began the Interim Armored Vehicle (IAV) program to implement Shinseki's concept. United Defense LP (UDLP) proposed the AGS, as well as a version of the Mobile Tactical Vehicle Light, for the Mobile Gun System variant of the IAV in 2000. United Defense provided an AGS armored in level 1, 2 and 3 for a platform performance demonstration from December 1999 to January 2000. By then, the AGS had reached an advanced level of technological maturity, and thus UDLP said it could field its design almost two years earlier than the General Motors' LAV III proposal. The AGS lost out to the General Motors proposal, which was type classified as the Stryker M1128 Mobile Gun System. UDLP protested the award, alleging that the Army disregarded its own timeline requirements, and that the requirements had been crafted with a wheeled vehicle in mind. The General Accounting Office denied UDLP's protest in April 2001.

In March 2004, at the 82nd Airborne Division's request, the Army approved the transfer of four production vehicles from United Defense's facility in Pennsylvania to Fort Bragg, North Carolina. The vehicles were intended to bolster the 82nd's 1st Squadron, 17th Cavalry, which was in need of greater firepower for an upcoming deployment to the recent war in Iraq. However, in June 2004, this plan was put on hold while the Army determined whether the Mobile Gun System (MGS) could meet the 82nd's requirements. An air-drop test of a Stryker weighted to simulate the load of the MGS was conducted in August. Around the same time, the Army identified issues with the air-worthiness of the MGS, among the heavier of the Stryker family. Still more pervasive problems persisted with the autoloader. While this decision was on hold, Congressman Robin Hayes expressed frustration that the AGS had not been fielded, and called on the DoD to act swiftly to resolve the delay. In January 2005, the Army said it had ruled out fielding the AGS, saying the system lacked spare parts that would be required to maintain the vehicle for any significant length of time. The Army also doubled down on its commitment to fielding the MGS, which it said it could begin fielding in summer 2006.

United Defense sought overseas customers without success. In 1994 United Defense partnered with Rheinmetall to market the AGS to NATO allies. Taiwan had been interested in acquiring as many as 700 of the system, which would be produced domestically. In 1994, the U.S. State Department authorized the sale of just as many to Taiwan and Hwa Fong Industries of Taiwan and United Defense agreed to co-production conditional on the selection of vehicle by Taiwan. In 1996, United Defense had plans to ship one AGS prototype to Taiwan. In 1996, United Defense partnered with FMC Nurol to offer the AGS to the Turkish Land Forces, which was seeking a main battle tank. By 1998, Canada, Germany, Malaysia and Singapore had expressed interest in the tank. In 1999, officials from Japan observed the AGS prior to embarking on a light tank program of their own.

In 2015, the U.S. Army articulated a requirement for a Mobile Protected Firepower system to replace the Mobile Gun System. In 2017, the Army formalized its requirements with a request for proposals. The MPF was defined as an air-transportable light tank to assist infantry brigades in forced entry operations. The Army sought to buy 504 MPF systems. Requirements called for a tracked vehicle armed with a 105 mm or 120 mm caliber cannon, which would not need to be air-droppable. BAE Systems (which bought United Defense in 2005) entered a modernized AGS into the MPF competition. In 2018, the Army selected bids from GDLS and BAE to build 12 prototypes each. BAE began delivering the prototype vehicles to the Army in December 2020, although the last of these were delivered behind schedule after testing had begun. The Army's evaluation of BAE and General Dynamics prototypes at Fort Bragg continued through August. In February 2022, BAE was eliminated from the competition due to noncompliance issues, leaving the General Dynamics Griffin as the only MPF entry. In June 2022, the Army selected the Griffin as the winner of the MPF competition.

Design 
The basic hull of the AGS is made of welded 5083 aluminium alloy, with a modular armor system that allows the vehicle to be equipped according to requirements. Aluminum was chosen instead of steel in order to reduce the weight of the vehicle. The weight limit for the vehicle was driven by the requirement that it be capable of low-velocity airdrop (LVAD).

Protection 

The CCVL hull was all-welded aluminum with bolt-on steel composite armor. Appliqué armor could also be installed by the user.

The AGS was designed with three modular armor levels:

The Level I (basic) armor package consisted of ceramic armor tiles and protected the vehicle against small-arms fire and shell splinters. It was designed for the rapid deployment role and could be airdropped from a C-130.
The Level II armor package consisted of additional plates of titanium, hardened steel and expanded metal.
Level III armor consisted of bolt-on armor boxes, and is designed for contingency operations and provides protection against light handheld anti-tank weapons. Level III-armored AGS systems cannot be carried by C-130.

The crew is protected from ammunition explosion by blowout panels on the roof and a bulkhead separating the ammunition from the crew. Unlike the CCVL, the AGS is equipped with NBC overpressure system. The Army omitted a requirement for radiation hardening from the AGS.

Two 8-barrel smoke grenade launchers were mounted to the turret which could fire a variety of obscurants.

The CCVL was protected from 30 mm rounds over the frontal arc.The United Defense Mobile Gun System variant included 7.62 mm integral armor protection over most of the vehicle, and 14.5 mm AP protection over the frontal 60-degree arc. BAE equipped the Mobile Protected Firepower variant of the AGS with underbody blast protection from roadside bombs.

Mobility 

This had 65 percent commonality with the eight-cylinder version of the Heavy Expanded Mobility Tactical Truck (HEMTT). The AGS's power-to-weight ratio was greater than the M1A1 Abrams. The General Electric hydromechanical HMPT-500 transmission is also used by the Bradley Fighting Vehicle. Mounted on two tracks, the powerpack slides out for maintenance, and can be run while it sits on the tracks at the rear of the vehicle. An auxiliary power unit was considered, but ultimately omitted from the final design to save weight. 

Many different engines, including a gas turbine, were considered for follow-on versions of the CCVL. The Detroit Diesel engine was replaced in the Mobile Protected Firepower variant with an unspecified model, this one also developing .

FMC designed the CCVL with to be capable LAPES (low-altitude parachute-extraction system) airdrop from a C-130. The Army required two variants of the AGS. One capable of the low-velocity airdrop from the C-17 Globemaster III (intended for the 82nd Airborne), and a heavier variant with roll-on/roll-off capability from the C-5 Galaxy, C-17, C-141 Starlifter and C-130 Hercules. In 1990, the Army had demoted the requirement for LAPES from a required capability to a desired one. After winning the AGS contract, FMC further whittled down the weight of the AGS in order make the tank light enough for low-velocity airdrop from a C-130.

Level II and III armor packages can be airdropped separately from the AGS and installed in the field in under three hours. All versions are air-transportable by C-130, C-141, C-17 and C-5 (one, two, three and five systems respectively). The vehicle height is reduced by removing or retracting the commander's cupola. Up to 10 rounds of 105 mm ammunition can be carried in ready capacity. The MPF variant retained airlift capability: one could fit on the C-130 and three on the C-17.

A 1993 TRADOC study called for modifying 53 HEMTTs as Contingency Force Recovery Vehicles to assist with recovering the AGS. In 1994, the Army began seeking an assault bridge for the AGS. The service was seeking 18 medium assault bridge vehicles, but hadn't been able to identify either an off-the-shelf solution nor funding to develop one.

Firepower 

The AGS is armed with the Watervliet Arsenal M35 rifled autoloading 105 mm caliber soft-recoil tank gun with an M240 7.62 mm caliber machine gun mounted coaxially.

The M35, known as the EX35 and XM35 during development, was originally designed and developed by Benét Laboratories, Watervliet Arsenal in 1983 for the Marine Corps Mobile Protected Gun Program. The M35 is about  lighter than the M68 used on the M60 tank.

The M35 fires all NATO standard 105 mm ammunition in inventory. The M35 has a rate of fire of approximately 12 rounds per minute, with a ready capacity of 21 rounds and 9 more in hull stowage. It has a laser rangefinder from the M1 Abrams, and the Computing Devices Canada Mission Management Cumputer System fire-control system is the same used in the Challenger 2. Prototype versions of the AGS gun had a pepperpot muzzle brake which was anticipated would be deleted in the production version.

The gun is stabilized with a Cadillac Gage two-axis system. Gun depression and traverse is hydraulic, with a manual back up for emergencies. Depression and elevation is −10 degrees, except over a rear 60 degree arc, where it is limited to 0 degrees.

The CCVL was originally armed with Rheinmetall's soft-recoil version of the M68A1. It held 19 ready rounds, plus 24 in hull storage.

The autoloader was designed by FMC's Naval Systems Division. It is fed by a rotating 21-round magazine. The gunner selects the type of ammunition to be fired and the computer rotates the magazine to select the correct round accordingly. Automatic and single-shot modes are available. After firing, the gun returns to zero degrees elevation. The autoloader extracts the spent shell casing from the breech, then ejects the casing out of the turret through the same port used to load the autoloader. Once the autoloader has loaded the next round, the gun returns to the elevation of the last target. If the autoloader is disabled, the crew can load the AGS under armor at a rate of three rounds per minute.

The gunner Hughes day/night thermal sight was stabilized. The CCVL had a commander's independent thermal viewer, but this was later eliminated to save weight.

The M35 fires all NATO-standard 105 mm caliber ammunition. The AGS can defeat 75 to 80 percent of tanks it may encounter on the battlefield. The AGS has the potential to engage main battle tanks, but these more heavily armored vehicles are less likely to be the AGS's main targets. The planned targets for the AGS ranged from bunkers and other man-made structures to armored personnel carriers and light armored vehicles.

A Browning M2 12.7 mm (.50) caliber heavy machine gun is mounted in a fully traversable ring-style mount on the commander's hatch. Other possible weapons were a M240 7.62 mm caliber machine gun or an MK 19 40 mm grenade launcher.

Miscellany  
The AGS has a 1553 data bus. This is not present in the CCVL. The AGS is equipped with an infantry phone.

Comparison of tanks

Subcontractors 
Subcontractors as of 1996:

Chrysler Corporation (Pentastar)
Computing Devices Canada
Detroit Diesel
General Electric Company
General Motors Corporation (Hughes Electronics)
Textron Inc.: (Cadillac Gage)
Watervliet Arsenal

Variants

Close Combat Vehicle Light

FMC began developing the Close Combat Vehicle Light as a private venture in 1983. The first prototype CCVL was completed in August 1985 and debuted at the meeting of the Association of the United States Army in October.

M8 Armored Gun System/Buford
The AGS eliminated the commander's independent thermal viewer of the CCVL. The Watervliet Arsenal M35 replaced the M68A1 gun.

Vickers/FMC Mark 5 battle tank
In 1985 the British Vickers Defence Systems and FMC collaborated on a derivative of the CCVL intended for export customers. The prototype was completed in May 1986 and first publicly appeared later that year. The tank had a fourth crewmember in lieu of an autoloader. It was armed with a 105 mm low recoil force gun, and could accept a number of other 105 mm guns as well.

Line of Sight Anti-Tank (LOSAT)
In 1994, Loral Vought Systems was awarded a contract worth up to $42.5 million ($ in ) to integrate the LOSAT missile onto an AGS chassis. In lieu of the turret, a missile pod with 12 kinetic energy missiles was installed. At least one full-scale mockup of the AGS LOSAT had been constructed by 1995. Delivery of the AGS LOSAT was scheduled for 1996. After the cancelation of the AGS, the Army switched the chassis of the LOSAT to the Humvee.

M8 Enhanced Capabilities Demonstrator/Thunderbolt
A single technology demonstrator built by United Defense and demonstrated in 2003. The ECD had a hybrid electric drive instead of a diesel engine. The tracks were a rubber band type. Armament was an XM291 120 mm electrothermal-chemical smoothbore cannon fitted with an autoloader. A storage area in the rear could be used to carry up to four crew members or other equipment, such as additional ammunition.

Lightning Bolt
In August 2004, BAE conducted live fire testing of the Lightning Bolt at Camp Roberts, California. Like the ECD, the Lightning Bolt incorporated a hybrid electric drive and XM291.

120 Armored Gun System
BAE Systems debuted the AGS 120 in 2006. The chassis was based on the original M8 AGS but integrated the 120 mm gun and turret of the ECD/Thunderbolt.

Mobile Protected Firepower
BAE Systems entered an updated variant of the M8 in the U.S. Army Mobile Protected Firepower program. According to BAE, the MPF variant is completely redesigned, keeping only the footprint (length, width and height). The MPF incorporates a new transmission and MTU powerpack, band composite rubber track and a new fire-control system. BAE added improved underbody armor, as well as the Iron Fist active protection system and BAE's Terra Raven soft-kill system.

Singapore design study
In 2004, United Defense and Singapore studied using the AGS to meet the country's requirement for a replacement for its AMX-13 SM1 light tanks. In addition to a Thunderbolt-derived AGS variant, United Defense submitted a number of designs that mounted the Thunderbolt AGS's 120 mm cannon/turret (and alternatively, 105 mm) on a variety of chassis. These chassis were the 
Bionix IFV and the Universal Combat Vehicle Platform that the Primus self-propelled howitzer was based on.

Gallery 
The Close Combat Vehicle Light at the National Museum of Military Vehicles in 2020.

See also 
 General Dynamics Griffin II
 2S25 Sprut-SD, Russian airborne light tank
 XM1202 Mounted Combat System, a U.S. Army tank, that was part of the Future Combat Systems Manned Ground Vehicles program cancelled in 2011
 Mobile Gun System, a U.S. Army assault gun acquisition program (part of the Interim Armored Vehicle program), in which the AGS took part
 Mobile Protected Firepower, ongoing U.S. Army light tank acquisition program, in which the AGS is taking part
 Future Scout and Cavalry System/TRACER, a joint UK–U.S. scout vehicle canceled in 2001

Notes

References

Bibliography

External links 
M8 Armored Gun System at GlobalSecurity.org

Light tanks of the United States
Airborne tanks
Fire support vehicles
Tanks with autoloaders
Cold War tanks of the United States
Light tanks of the Cold War
Post–Cold War light tanks
Post–Cold War tanks of the United States
Abandoned military projects of the United States
United Defense
BAE Systems land vehicles
FMC Corporation